Twenty-Eight Teeth is an album by the American ska punk band Buck-O-Nine, released in 1997.

"My Town", about  La Jolla, California, peaked at No. 32 on Billboard'''s Modern Rock Tracks chart. The album peaked at No. 190 on the Billboard 200.Twenty-Eight Teeth sold more than 200,000 copies. The band promoted it by touring with Primus.

Production
The album was produced by Neill King and David Kershenbaum. It contains a cover of Joe Jackson's "I'm the Man". "What Happened to My Radio?" is about the narrowing of radio playlists.

Critical receptionThe Record called the album "an infectious and energetic workout that avoids the same-rhythm rut that most bands of the snappy, staggered-tempo genre fall into." The San Diego Union-Tribune noted that "'Nineteen' is jet-powered by Jonas Kleiner's careening guitars, while 'My Town' gets its cheery bounce from Scott Kennerly's bobbing bass and Steve Bauer's swinging drums." The New Times Broward-Palm Beach'' praised the "full-throttle skacore ... where hyperactive ska grooves set the pace only to lurch into supercharged punk status come chorus time."

AllMusic wrote that "Buck-O-Nine needs to give more time to the horn section and engage in the kind of loopy interplay that made the Specials so interesting."

Track listing
All songs written by Buck-O-Nine except "I'm The Man" written by Joe Jackson

Credits

Performance
Jon Pebsworth - Vocals
Jonas Kleiner - Guitar
Dan Albert - Trombone
Anthony Curry - Trumpet
Craig Yarnold - Tenor Sax
Scott Kennerly - Bass
Steve Bauer - Drums

References

1997 albums
Buck-O-Nine albums
TVT Records albums